Cholinergic receptor, nicotinic, alpha 6, also known as nAChRα6,  is a protein that in humans is encoded by the CHRNA6 gene. The CHRNA6 gene codes for the α6 nicotinic receptor subunit that is found in certain types of nicotinic acetylcholine receptors found primarily in the brain. Neural nicotinic acetylcholine receptors containing α6 subunits are expressed on dopamine-releasing neurons in the midbrain, and dopamine release following activation of these neurons is thought to be involved in the addictive properties of nicotine. Due to their selective localisation on dopaminergic neurons, α6-containing nACh receptors have also been suggested as a possible therapeutic target for the treatment of Parkinson's disease.
In addition to nicotine, research in animals has implicated alpha-6-containing nAChRs in the abusive and addictive properties of ethanol, with mecamylamine demonstrating a potent ability to block these properties.

Interactive pathway map

See also
 Nicotinic acetylcholine receptor

References

Further reading

External links 
 
 

Ion channels
Nicotinic acetylcholine receptors